Jalangi may refer to:
 Jalangi, a village in West Bengal, India
 Jalangi (community development block), community development block in West Bengal, India
 Jalangi Mahavidyalaya, college in West Bengal, India
 Jalangi River, river in India
 Jalangi (Vidhan Sabha constituency), an assembly constituency in West Bengal, India